The Golden Goal is a 1918 American silent drama film directed by Paul Scardon, written by Garfield Thompson and Lawrence McCloskey.  The film stars Harry T. Morey, Florence Deshon, and Jean Paige.

Cast list

References

American black-and-white films
American silent feature films
1918 drama films
Films directed by Paul Scardon
1910s American films